Noam Chomsky: A Life of Dissent is a 1997 biography of Noam Chomsky written by Robert Barsky and published by The MIT Press.

Bibliography

External links 

 
 

1997 non-fiction books
English-language books
MIT Press books
Works about Noam Chomsky
Biographies about anarchists
Biographies about linguists
Biographies about philosophers